The canton of Saint-Pierre-d'Albigny is an administrative division of the Savoie department, southeastern France. Its borders were modified at the French canton reorganisation which came into effect in March 2015. Its seat is in Saint-Pierre-d'Albigny.

It consists of the following communes:

Aiton
Argentine
Betton-Bettonet
Bonvillaret
Bourgneuf
Chamousset
Chamoux-sur-Gelon
Champ-Laurent
Châteauneuf
Coise-Saint-Jean-Pied-Gauthier
Cruet
Épierre
Fréterive
Hauteville
Montendry
Montgilbert
Montsapey
Saint-Alban-d'Hurtières
Saint-Georges-d'Hurtières
Saint-Jean-de-la-Porte
Saint-Léger
Saint-Pierre-d'Albigny
Saint-Pierre-de-Belleville
Val-d'Arc
Villard-Léger

References

Cantons of Savoie